Chris Stevens (born 12 February 1946) is an Australian former national representative rower. He competed in the men's coxless pair event at the 1972 Summer Olympics.

Club and state rowing
Stevens' senior club rowing was from the Sydney Rowing Club.

In 1966, 1967 and 1970 he was seated in the New South Wales state eight which contested the Kings Cup at the Interstate Regatta within the Australian Rowing Championships. The 1967 New South Wales crews were victorious.

At the 1966 Australian Rowing Championships in a composite SRC/SUBC crew Stevens, Alf Duval, John Ranch, Peter Dickson, and cox Brian Thomas won the Australian coxed four title.  In 1970 with Haberfield's Dick Reddel he won the national championship title in a  double scull.  In a Haberfield / Sydney composite crew in 1972 he won the national coxed four title

International representative rowing
In 1966 he was selected at three in the Australian coxed four which competed at the 1966 World Rowing Championships in Bled, Yugoslavia.

In 1972 was in the bow seat of an Australian coxless pair which raced at the Munich Olympics. Rowing with Kim Mackney, the pair was eliminated in the repechage.

References

1946 births
Living people
Australian male rowers
Olympic rowers of Australia
Rowers at the 1972 Summer Olympics
Place of birth missing (living people)